Zhang Yudong (Chinese: 张煜东; born 9 September 1992 in Shanghai) is a Chinese football player who currently plays as a midfielder for Kunshan FC.

Club career
Born in Shanghai, Zhang joined Genbao Football Academy. He was promoted to academy's first team Shanghai East Asia in 2009. In January 2012, Zhang transferred to Chinese Super League side Shanghai Shenxin. He made his league debut for Shanghai on 27 April 2012 in a game against Beijing Guoan, coming on as a substitute for Wang Yun in the 78th minute. Unfortunately he go on to also be part of the team that were relegated at the end of the 2015 Chinese Super League. After several seasons he moved to third tier club Kunshan and was part of the team that gained promotion to the second tier at the end of the 2019 China League Two campaign. He would go on to establish himself as regular within the team and was part of the squad that won the division and promotion to the top tier at the end of the 2022 China League One campaign.

Career statistics 
Statistics accurate as of match played 25 December 2022.

Honours

Club 
Kunshan
 China League One: 2022

References

External links
 

1992 births
Living people
Chinese footballers
Footballers from Shanghai
Shanghai Port F.C. players
Shanghai Shenxin F.C. players
Kunshan F.C. players
Chinese Super League players
China League One players
China League Two players
Association football midfielders